The Hubble Legacy Field is an image of a small region of space in the constellation Fornax, containing an estimated 265,000 galaxies. The original release was composed of Hubble Space Telescope data accumulated over a 16-year period. Looking back approximately 13 billion years (between 400 and 800 million years after the Big Bang) it has been used to search for galaxies that existed at that time. The image was taken in a section of the sky with a low density of bright stars in the near-field, allowing much better viewing of dimmer, more distant objects. It builds on the data collected for the Hubble Ultra-Deep Field, the Hubble eXtreme Deep Field and the Great Observatories Origins Deep Survey.

Located southwest of Orion in the southern-hemisphere constellation Fornax, the approximately rectangular image is about 25 arcminutes to an edge. This is almost the angular diameter of a full moon viewed from Earth (which is about 31 arcminutes, or a half a degree).

The images and data release were announced on May 2, 2019, by NASA.

Planning
As with the earlier fields, this one was required to contain very little emission from our galaxy, with little Zodiacal dust. The field was also required to be in a range of declinations such that it could be observed both by southern hemisphere instruments, such as the Atacama Large Millimeter Array, and northern hemisphere ones, such as those located on Hawaii. It was ultimately decided to observe a section of the Chandra Deep Field South, due to existing deep X-ray observations from Chandra X-ray Observatory and two interesting objects already observed in the Great Observatories Origins Deep Survey sample at the same location: a redshift 5.8 galaxy and a supernova. The coordinates of the field are right ascension , declination  (J2000).

Observations
The Hubble Legacy Field is composed of data from 7,500 exposures, with a total exposure time of 250 days.

Video

See also
 List of deep fields
 List of UDF objects (1–500)

References

External links

 Scalable interactive Hubble Legacy Field. Wikisky.org
Hubble Legacy Field at HubbleSite

Hubble Space Telescope images
Physical cosmology
Sky regions
Fornax (constellation)
Astronomy image articles
2019 works
2010s photographs